KWAY (1470 AM) is a commercial radio station serving the Waverly, Iowa area as well as Butler, Bremer and Black Hawk counties.  The station primarily broadcasts a country music format.  KWAY is licensed to Ael Suhr Enterprises, Inc.

The station's antenna system uses two towers arranged in a directional array that concentrates its signal toward the northeast. The studios, transmitter, and towers are located on the south side of Waverly, at 110 29th Avenue SW.

External links

WAY
Country radio stations in the United States